Eternal Beauty is a 2019 dark comedy film written and directed by Craig Roberts. It stars Sally Hawkins, David Thewlis, Billie Piper, Penelope Wilton, Alice Lowe and Robert Aramayo.

It had its world premiere at the BFI London Film Festival on 8 October 2019. It was released in the United Kingdom and United States on 2 October 2020, by Bulldog Film Distribution and Samuel Goldwyn Films.

Cast
 Sally Hawkins as Jane
Morfydd Clark as Young Jane
 David Thewlis as Mike
 Billie Piper as Nicola
Natalie O'Neill as Young Nicola
 Penelope Wilton as Vivian
 Alice Lowe as Alice
Elysia Welch as Young Alice
 Robert Aramayo as Johnny
 Robert Pugh as Dennis
 Paul Hilton as Tony
 Rita Bernard-Shaw as Lucy
 Banita Sandhu as Alex
 Boyd Clack as Psychiatrist

Production
In December 2017, it was announced Sally Hawkins had been cast in the film, with Craig Roberts directing from a screenplay he wrote. Cliff Edge Pictures will produce the film. In February 2018, Alice Lowe and David Thewlis joined the cast of the film. In June 2018, Billie Piper and Penelope Wilton joined the cast of the film. That same month, Robert Pugh, Paul Hilton and Morfydd Clark joined the cast. In July 2018, Robert Aramayo joined the cast.

Principal photography began in June 2018 in Wales.

Release
It had its world premiere at the BFI London Film Festival on 8 October 2019. In July 2020, Samuel Goldwyn Films acquired U.S. distribution rights to the film. It was released in the United Kingdom on 2 October 2020 and in the United States.

Reception

Critical reception
The site's critical consensus reads, "Eternal Beauty deals unevenly yet honorably with complicated themes, elevated by strong work from the ever-reliable Sally Hawkins and David Thewlis."

References

External links
 
 

2019 films
American romantic drama films
British romantic drama films
American independent films
British independent films
Fictional portrayals of schizophrenia
Films directed by Craig Roberts
2010s English-language films
2010s American films
2010s British films
2019 independent films